Adam Gierasch and Jace Anderson are American husband-and-wife filmmakers, known for their work in the horror genre. Adam Gierasch is also known as an actor and director, and he released his directorial debut Autopsy in 2008.

Filmography

Films written together
Spiders (2000, screenplay)
Crocodile (2000, screenplay)
Panic (2002, screenplay)
Crocodile 2: Death Swamp (2002, screenplay)
Derailed (2002, screenplay)
Killer Rats (2003, screenplay)
Toolbox Murders (2004)
Mortuary (2005)
Mother of Tears (2007)
Autopsy (2008)
Night of the Demons (2009)
Fertile Ground (2011)
Fractured (2013)

Anderson, as actor
Thirsty (2009, voice of Slushy Cup)
Fertile Ground (2011, as Headmistress in Photo)
This Week in Horror (2011, 1 episode, as herself)
FEARnet's Movies with More Brains (2011, as herself)
Into the Dark: Exploring the Horror Film (TBA, as herself)

Anderson, as producer
Fractured (2013)
House by the Lake (2015)

Gierasch, as director
Autopsy (2008, also scriptwriter)
Night of the Demons (2009, also screenplay)
Fertile Ground (2011, also scriptwriter)
Fractured (2013, also scriptwriter)
House by the Lake (2015)
Tales of Halloween (2015, segment Trick)

Gierasch, as actor
Martial Law (1999, 1 episode, as Groomsman)
The Others (2000, 1 episode, as Male Passenger)
Crocodile (2000, as Lester)
Beyond Belief: Fact or Fiction (2000, 1 episode)
Rats (2003, as Jim)
Toolbox Murders (2004, as Ned Lundy)
The Hollow (2004, as Dad)
Mortuary (2005, as Mr. Barstow)
Roman (2006, as Boyd)
Room Nine (2007, as Mechanic)
Red Sands (2009, as Sergeant Ramsey)
Thirsty (2009, as Conspiracy Host- voice only)
Fertile Ground (2011, as Otto)
Big Ass Spider (2011, as Homeless Man)

References

External links
 
 

American actresses
Living people
20th-century births
American film producers
American film directors
American male film actors
Place of birth missing (living people)
+
American television writers
Year of birth missing (living people)
American horror writers
Married couples
Screenwriting duos
American male screenwriters
American male television writers
American women film producers
21st-century American women